Gold Coast Hockey Centre is a hockey stadium in Gold Coast, Queensland, Australia. The venue was renovated to host the men's and women's hockey event of the 2018 Commonwealth Games. It was redeveloped for $16.5 million and was completed in June 2017. It is located at Keith Hunt Park in Labrador and is home to the Gold Coast Hockey Association and the Labrador Hockey Club.

References

External links 

 Official site

Field hockey venues in Australia
2018 Commonwealth Games venues
Hockey at the 2018 Commonwealth Games
Sports venues on the Gold Coast, Queensland